Taj Mahal is a 1995 Telugu-language romance film directed by Muppalaneni Shiva and produced by D. Ramanaidu. The film stars Srikanth, Monica Bedi and Sanghavi. The music was composed by M. M. Srilekha. It is the first successful film for Srikanth as a lead actor and the debut film of noted lyricist Chandrabose.

Cast
Srikanth
Monica Bedi
Sanghavi
Srihari
Ranganath
Kota Srinivasa Rao
Nutan Prasad
Sudha
Brahmanandam
Babu Mohan
Sudhakar
Mallikarjuna Rao
Banerjee
Ananth Babu
Achyuth as Raja

Soundtrack
"Chiku Look Chiku Look" - S. P. Balasubrahmanyam, K. S. Chithra
"O Kala Kannadi" - S. P. Balasubrahmanyam, K. S. Chithra
"Jhum Jhum Antu" - S. P. Balasubrahmanyam, K. S. Chithra
"Pelli Pellantu" - S. P. Balasubrahmanyam, K. S. Chithra
"Saagipoye Neeli Megham" - S. P. Balasubrahmanyam, K. S. Chithra
"Manchu Kondallona Chandrama" - S. P. Balasubrahmanyam, K. S. Chithra

Awards
 Nandi Award for Best Villain - Srihari

References

External links

1995 films
1990s Telugu-language films
Indian romance films
Films set in Uttar Pradesh
Films shot in Uttar Pradesh
1990s romance films
Films directed by Muppalaneni Shiva
Films scored by M. M. Srilekha